Red Bull X-Fighters was a freestyle motocross motorbike stunt competition organized by Red Bull from 2001 to 2017. It was the most popular freestyle motocross event in the world, with a 15-year plus history and more than 50 past events on six continents. The riders are invited to compete head-to-head through a series of knockout rounds in bullrings and famous locations and sites.

History

X-Fighters: 2001–06

X-Fighters was founded in 2001, and became the most famous freestyle motocross event series in the world. The Plaza de Toros de Valencia in Spain was where it began, being the first venue to host the competition. A 12,000 person crowd was recorded, with American 'Mad' Mike Jones taking out the inaugural event, and the host nations very own Edgar Torronteras coming second and French rider, Xavier Fabre coming third respectively. After the impact made in 2001, Red Bull X-Fighters returned for a second time. Moving from the bullring in Valencia to Madrid's Las Ventas. The crowd had almost doubled in size from the previous year, with the arena to a full capacity of nearly 20,000. It was another close series of head-to-heads between riders like Mike Metzger and the previous year's champion, Mike Jones. But it was Spain's Edgar Torronteras, that won the event and took the trophy that season. Firmly securing X-Fighters foothold as one of the major events in FMX history and Europe's biggest FMX event.

2003 was to bring about some major developments to the event. It introduced the line up of events to increase from one to two that year with both Valencia and Madrid staging competitions in their bullrings. But Red Bull X-Fighters and the entire sport of FMX witnessed one of its first major tricks. At Las Ventas in Madrid, a new rider to the competition, the 18-year-old from Phoenix, Arizona, Nate Adams created freestyle motocross history after performing the first ever back flip at the event.

The riders then returned to compete in the bullring of Madrid for the only X-Fighters event of 2004. Having a major impact on the pace of progression in the sport that year that the back flip had gone from what most people didn't think was possible to an almost standard feature in most riders runs. Riders were not only performing back flips with ease, they were laying down back flip combinations. Joining the event was a new face on the Red Bull X-Fighters scene, the well-known Travis Pastrana. It saw him and Adams stage the first of their head-to-head battles, going all in a battle against each other and pulling off spectacular 360's in front of huge crowds. Pastrana took first and Adams second. Ronnie Renner did his first competitive backflip in Madrid that year. The following year, after continuous success in Spain, X-Fighters staged its first event outside of Europe. Bringing the riders in FMX to compete at the biggest bullring on the planet, the Plaza de Toros México in Mexico City. The growing popularity of the sport was proved by the capacity crowd of over 40,000 fans. Once again the riders proved why FMX was becoming one of the most incredible spectator sports in the world by putting on another massive watched competition that was eventually won by Ronnie Renner. After Mexico, Madrid hosted yet another event, which Nate Adams won. Lastly, in 2006, Mexico City and Madrid were to repeat the following year and host the last two events before the World Tour format began.

World Tour: 2007–15
In 2007, X-Fighters was becoming a global phenomenon. But the year had a special significance as X-Fighters moved from the exclusive bullring locations into new inspirational arenas. It reached double figures, celebrating its tenth competition in Mexico City. But it was the next stop that was a new direction for the event. Instead of the bullrings that housed every event so far, Red Bull X-Fighters instead built a very different course. Against a backdrop of historic Slane Castle in Ireland. This stunning setting had previously played host to the likes of the Rolling Stones, Madonna, and Guns N' Roses; although the conditions were wet as rain fell heavily in Slane Castle, dampening most riders ability to really take on the course. But there was one rider that refused to be compromised and displayed the pure pioneer spirit, coming first in the event, Travis Pastrana. After Ireland, the newly world tour ended and rounded off in a return to Madrid. Pastrana again proving he was one of the greatest riders after he rode to yet his second consecutive win that season.

2008 will always be remembered amongst FMX fans as the year Red Bull X-Fighters truly became a fully fledged international tour. That was the year it went global. Expanding its line up of stops from three in 2007 to six. Taking in Mexico, making its first visit to South America with a trip to the Sambadrome in Rio de Janeiro before coming north of the border to Texas. Then across the Atlantic to the European legs of Spain, Germany and Poland. After Mat Rebeaud's devastating dominance in 2008, the international line-up of riders were competitive and much different as event nineteen marked the start of the 2009 season and a fresh new face joined the line up of riders competing in the monumental Plaza de Toros México. A 17-year-old from New Zealand, Levi Sherwood. As soon as he came out into that arena it soon became clear that he had something that would set the sport alight. His superb debut showing resulted in a worthy win and set the tone for what was going to continue to be a landmark season. After a closely fought contest in Calgary, Canada, the tour rode into Texas. The course built in Fort Worth for the twenty-first Red Bull X-Fighters certainly was known as one of their biggest courses created. With new tricks being performed, Cam Sinclair introduced the double back flip. He successfully pulled it off, being the first rider to do so in a competition run. Moving on to the next event in Madrid, Sinclair again attempted the double back flip but this time got it horribly wrong. He suffered severe head injuries, a ruptured liver, extensive internal bleeding, a broken shoulder and cheekbone, also had brain swelling causing him to be in a coma for seven days. With Sinclair in recovery, the 2009 tour ended with Red Bull X-Fighters twenty-third event and a first for London with a spectacular finale at the iconic Battersea Power Station.

In 2010 Red Bull X-Fighters were granted permission to stage an event in Moscow's Red Square right beside the Kremlin, using it as their backdrop. Not only that, they were also given permission to base an event at the Giza Plateau in Egypt with the Great Sphinx of Giza in the background. Red Bull X-Fighters then marked past in its quarter century with another return to its long serving Madrid. Australian Robbie Maddison had a special surprise in store for the Spanish fans pulling off a body varial. A first ever seen trick in the competition, Maddison went on to win the event but it was to be his downfall as he prepared for the following event in London. He bailed in an attempt at the volt badly, ending his season. After the UK stop, X-Fighters wrapped up its twenty-ninth event by rounding off the 2010 tour in Italy where Nate Adams achieved another first to add to his Red Bull X-Fighters career. Being the first rider to claim a second title for a second consecutive year.

2011 saw Red Bull X-Fighters reach its 10th anniversary and stadiums and arenas across the world were selling out to a huge international fan base. It brought up its 30th event on Jumeirah Beach in Dubai. The tour then encountered a spectacular show when it staged round two of the championship in front of the Monumental Axis in the Brazil capital, Brasilia. In front of a crowd with over 100,000 people, was the biggest FMX attended event in the history of the sport. Following the events in Rome, Madrid, and Poznań, the tour ended in a grand finale on Cockatoo Island in the heart of Sydney Harbour, Australia. Making the most of competing in front of his home crowd for the first time was Australia's Josh Sheehan. He surprised everyone by pulling off the last win of 2011. But the tour title that year belonged to someone else, Dany Torres. In 2012 the Red Bull X-Fighters tour took a huge leap forward. It started in Dubai with a course that included the biggest jump distance ever built in a competitive freestyle course but the next event was a giant leap of FMX kind. In Glen Helen, Red Bull created the biggest course ever constructed. After the huge course the tour moved to Europe in Madrid where New Zealander Levi Sherwood took a stunning victory and extended his lead in the overall standings. Next up was Munich's Olympic Stadium which became the stage of a night of huge drama and significance in the freestyle world. The leading man was Tom Pagès. The tour was set for another close finale once again on Cockatoo Island in Australia. It saw Jackson Strong perform X-Fighters first front flip and did it again one handed. But it came down to the overall current first and second place riders to meet in the final for a chance to win the World Tour title. It was Sherwood whom bet Pagès after he performed the huge tricks and style when it really mattered to take the 2012 title.

Grand Slam: 2016–present
After eight spectacular years of the Red Bull X-Fighters World Tour, 2016 concentrated on one season highlight event at the legendary Plaza de Toros de Las Ventas in Madrid on June 24. The Red Bull X-Fighters stop in Madrid marked the 15th straight year that the famous bullring hosted the event of Freestyle Motocross, where the world's best riders have been showcasing new and exciting tricks since 2002. France's Tom Pagès became the first rider in history to win Madrid three consecutive times with his stirring victory in 2015 in front of another sold-out house of 23,000 spectators. Travis Pastrana of the USA had also won Madrid three times but not consecutively while Spanish rider Dany Torres had won the most important stop of the season twice.

It was Tom Pagès who carved his name into the record books with a spectacular fourth straight Red Bull X-Fighters win in Madrid, the spiritual home of freestyle motocross that celebrated its 15th anniversary in style in front of a full house. At the Las Ventas bullring Pagès treated the crowd to his new Front Flip Flair, the first time ever the trick was performed in competition. In an epic three-way battle featuring the world's best FMX riders, Clinton Moore, the 2015 World Tour champion, came in a close second after a flawless run in the final with his Bundy jump recorded to be 14 meters high by a new Intel high-tech device. Josh Sheehan had to settle for third despite nailing his signature double back flip. Levi Sherwood of New Zealand finished fourth on an unforgettable night at the FMX extravaganza in the Spanish capital.

Format

Event
Each day of every event, riders get opportunities to train. Day one starts off with a briefing. Day two is qualification and day three is competition. In qualification, there is one 90-second qualifying run. All twelve riders ride in their start order. Any rider who misses a qualifying session will be scored in the last place position. Should more than one rider miss the qualifying session then previous year's Tour rank will determine placing, with the lowest ranked rider being scored as the last place. Should no Tour rank exists, and then a draw will take place to establish rank for the purpose of qualifying. The results of the qualification will define the three groups of four riders that will compete in the Cuadrillas Elimination.

The Cuadrillas Elimination is where each group of four riders will spin a roulette of tricks one time (old-school tricks that are barely shown in competition). All riders have to pull out this trick within their 50-second run. The best two riders of each group qualify for the semi-final. At the completion of each rider's run, the judges award a score. When all riders in this round have completed a scored run, the scores are announced and the top scored rider advances through to the semi-final. Six riders are then qualified in pairs and battle head-to-head in the semi-final, in which there is no mandatory trick. Each rider takes his own run with a pre-determined time limit (75 seconds). The lower seeded rider in each pair ride first. Time starts when the rider takes his first jump. After each run, the rider goes a pre-designated position to watch his replays on the big screen. The second rider in the pair, who is not riding, will wait at the Hot Spot, remove his helmet and watch the other rider's run. After the second rider's run, both wait at a pre-designated position for the judges' decision of whom of the two is in the Final round. The winner from each battle would advance to the final.

The final consists of three winners from the semi-final that meet in a head-to-head run-off. Each rider takes his own run with a pre-determined time limit (75 seconds). The rider from the semi-final A will ride first followed by the winner of the semi-final B and C. Time will start when the rider takes his first jump. After the 75 seconds each rider can perform a Bonus Trick which is not affected by the time limit. After each run, the rider goes a pre-designated position to watch his replay on the big screen. The second and third riders, who are not riding, will wait at the Hot Spot, remove their helmet and watch the other rider's run. After the third rider's run, all three wait at a pre-designated position for the judges' decision of whom of the three will be celebrated as the winner of the Red Bull X-Fighters competition. Overall the riders can win five helmets. If there is a tie (e.g. two riders win two helmets and one rider 1 helmet) the Bonus Tricks decides on the winner.

Judging
Judging in all rounds consist of five judges, each one judging the overall impression based on the following criteria:
 Variety
 Execution
 Form and flow
 Use of course
 Challenge
 Energy
 Excitement
 Entertainment

There are two separate judging systems for the Red Bull X-Fighters competition. Round one judging panel comprises five judges, plus one Head Judge. These judges will award each rider a score from 1-100 points. Final score will be represented as a number from 0–100 based on an average of all five judges' scores (From a total of 0 - 500 ÷ 5 judges) In the semi-finals and final, each judge award each of the riders in the heat a score on a scale of 1–100 points. The rider with the highest score from a single judge will win that judge's vote. The rider who gets three or more judges' votes out of five will win the match-up. The Head Judge is solely responsible for indicating when time expires on a run. If, in the mind of the Head Judge, a rider is considered to be 'on approach' to a jump when the time clock reaches zero, then that jump (or series of jumps in a double-double or 6-pack) will count in the rider's final score. The Head Judge will also have the ability to change any single score or group of scores and makes the final decision in any tiebreaker situations. Should two or more riders in Round one have a scoring tie out of 100 points, then the high and low scores for each rider will be eliminated and the remaining three scores averaged to give a score of 100 points. Should this method still result in a tie then the highest single score will break the tie(s). In the event that none of these methods breaks the tie(s) then the Head Judge will break the tie(s)

Venues
Overall there has been 25 different locations that have hosted an X-Fighters event. Below shows a list of former and current venues, along with their location and number of times taken part.

Results and statistics

Records

Dany Torres of Spain is the all-time top points holder on the World Tour, with 7 wins and 1 title. Torres also holds the following records; Most starts, Most head to heads, Most head to heads won, Most head to heads lost, Most quarterfinals, Most semi-finals, Most top three appearances and, Most World Tour top three appearances. He is the most successful rider to hold a total of 9 X-Fighters records. New Zealander Levi Sherwood holds two (Most finals and Most wins), with Nate Adams and Mat Rebeaud both holding one each.

World Tour champions

In all, 86 top riders have competed in at least one X-Fighters event. Of these, eight riders have won the World Tour. With two titles, American Nate Adams is the most successful World Tour rider. Adams (2009 and 2010) is also the only rider to have won two consecutive titles.

Wall of Fame

  1   Mike Jones
  2   Nate Adams
  3   Travis Pastrana
  4   Mat Rebeaud
  5   Robbie Maddison
  6   Dany Torres
  7   Levi Sherwood
  8   Eigo Satō
  9   Thomas Pagès
 10   Josh Sheehan

Red Bull X-Fighters released their very own Wall of Fame in a video about the history of the competition. There also is a Hall of Fame. There are only 9 Freestyle Motocross riders in the sport's most exclusive club. It is reserved only to the winners of Madrid, the most important FMX stop each year since the inaugural event in 2002. The Hall of Fame in Madrid features plaques hanging on the walls with the names, Spanish nicknames, and portraits of each year's winner, framed in the style of famous bullfighters who have also graced the grounds of the Las Ventas bullring. The Hall of Fame starts with Edgar Torronteras (2002, "E.T."), Kenny Bartram (2003, "El Cowboy"), Travis Pastrana (2004/06/07, "El Prodigioso"), Nate Adams (2005, "El Destroyer"), Mat Rebeaud (2008, "Air Mat"), Dany Torres (2009/11, "El Pajarillo"), Robbie Maddison (2010, "Mad Dog"), Levi Sherwood (2012/17 "El Chico de Goma") and Thomas Pagès (2013/14/15/16, "Mr Flair").

Race results

World Tours

Medal table

References

External links 
 Red Bull X-Fighters Facebook
 Red Bull X-Fighters Encyclopedia
 Red Bull X-Fighters Community

X-Fighters
Freestyle motocross